A Royal Demand a 1933 British historical drama directed by Gustav A. Mindzenti and starring Cyril McLaglen, Marjorie Hume and Fred Rains. It was made as a quota quickie for release by Paramount Pictures. It is set during the English Civil War.

Cast
 Cyril McLaglen as Lord Forest (Southampton) 
 Marjorie Hume as Lady Forest  
 Fred Rains as Walters  
 Vi Kaley as Nana  
 Powell Edwards as General Orring  
 Howard Fry as Lord Wentower  
 Tich Hunter as Robin  
 Gisela Leif Robinson as Lady Ann 
 Cynthia Clifford

References

Bibliography
 Low, Rachael. Filmmaking in 1930s Britain. George Allen & Unwin, 1985.
 Wood, Linda. British Films, 1927-1939. British Film Institute, 1986.

External links

1933 films
British historical drama films
1930s historical drama films
Paramount Pictures films
Films set in England
Films set in the 1640s
Quota quickies
British black-and-white films
1933 drama films
1930s English-language films
1930s British films